KS Cracovia is a Polish sports club based in Kraków.During the 2015-16 campaign they will compete in the following competitions:Ekstraklasa, Polish Cup.

Current squad

Competitions

Ekstraklasa

Polish Cup

Quarterfinals

References

External links 

 
Cracovia Unofficial website 
WikiPasy - encyclopedia about KS Cracovia (in Polish)
Cracovia unofficial website 

MKS Cracovia seasons
Cracovia